Chapman Township is the name of some places in the U.S. state of Pennsylvania:
Chapman Township, Clinton County, Pennsylvania
Chapman Township, Snyder County, Pennsylvania

Pennsylvania township disambiguation pages